Henichesk Raion is one of the 5 administrative raions (districts) of Kherson Oblast in southern Ukraine. Its administrative centre is located in the city of Henichesk. Population: 

On 18 July 2020, as part of the administrative reform of Ukraine, the number of raions of Kherson Oblast was reduced from 18 to five, and the area of Henichesk Raion was significantly expanded. Three abolished raions, Ivanivka, Nyzhni Sirohozy, and Novotroitske Raions, were merged into Henichesk Raion. The January 2020 estimate of the raion population was 

In 2008, the raion had a 10% Crimean Tatar minority, with the Tatar population reaching 50% in two villages. This minority is a result of a 1967 Soviet decree that restored Tatar rights lost during the 1944 deportation of the Crimean Tatars. Because de jure they were not allowed to return to their Crimea homeland, some Tatars settled in nearby places, including Henichesk Raion.

Subdivisions

Current
After the reform in July 2020, the raion consisted of 4 hromadas:
 Henichesk urban hromada with the administration in the city of Henichesk, retained from Henichesk Raion;
 Ivanivka settlement hromada with the administration in the urban-type settlement of Ivanivka, transferred from Ivanivka Raion.
 Novotroitske settlement hromada with the administration in the urban-type settlement of Novotroitske;
 Nyzhni Sirohozy settlement hromada with the administration in the urban-type settlement of Nyzhni Sirohozy;

Before 2020

Before the 2020 reform, the raion consisted of one hromada. Henichesk urban hromada with the administration in Henichesk.

Settlements 
Settlements in the raion include:
 Zelenyi Hai

References

External links

 
Raions of Kherson Oblast
Crimean Tatars
1923 establishments in Ukraine